Events in the year 2018 in Nauru.

Incumbents
 President: Baron Waqa
 Speaker of Parliament: Cyril Buraman

Events 
 10 January – Australian High Commissioner to Nauru Angela Tierney presents her credentials to President Waqa.
 30 January – The Nauruan government lifts a temporary ban on Facebook started in 2015.
 12 February – Nauru and South Ossetia abolish visa requirements for visits shorter than 90 days.
 18 February – Thirty-five refugees leave Nauru for resettlement in Los Angeles in the United States.
 25 February – Twenty-six refugees leave Nauru for resettlement in the United States.
 4 March – Twenty-nine refugees leave Nauru for resettlement in the United States.
 13 March – Australian judge Geoffrey Muecke takes the oath of office to become a justice of the Supreme Court of Nauru.
 9 April – Charisma Amoe-Tarrant wins Nauru a silver medal at the 2018 Commonwealth Games Women's +90kg weightlifting event in Gold Coast, Australia.
 30 April – Sixteen refugees leave Nauru for resettlement in the United States.
 1 June – Nauru nationals are granted visa-free entry to Taiwan for visits up to 30 days.
 15 June – An Iranian asylum seeker's body is found in an Australian offshore processing centre on Nauru. The asylum seeker committed suicide, the third in processing centres on Nauru to do so.
 2 July – Nauru announces plans to block Australian Broadcasting Corporation from attending and covering the Pacific Islands Forum in September.
 8 July – Twenty-three refugees leave Nauru for resettlement in the United States.
 22 July – Thirty-six refugees leave Nauru for resettlement in the United States.
 4 September – Television New Zealand reporter Barbara Dreaver is detained by the Nauru Police Force following an interviews with refugees.
 4 December – The Nauru Court of Appeals formally opens.
 Full Date Unknown
Nauru partners with the company DeepGreen Resources for future deep sea mining.
A coalition of Australian human rights groups set 20 November as a deadline for removing refugee from offshore detention centres in Nauru.

References

 
2010s in Nauru
Years of the 21st century in Nauru
Nauru
Nauru